Van Gogh is a Dutch toponymic surname meaning "from/of Goch", a town on the border of the Netherlands in the Kleve District of Germany. It is an uncommon surname (792 people in the Netherlands in 2007), and most people are, like the painter, descendant of Gerrit van Goch, who married in 1631 in The Hague. People with the surname include:

Anna van Gogh-Kaulbach (1869–1960), Dutch novelist, translator and playwright
Johanna van Gogh-Bonger (1862–1925), Dutch wife of Theo and key player in the spread of Vincent's fame
 (1817–1885), Dutch vice admiral, uncle of Vincent
Lothar van Gogh (1888–1945), Dutch footballer
Lieuwe van Gogh (born 1991), Dutch painter and great-great-grandson of the art dealer
Natalie van Gogh (born 1974), Dutch racing cyclist
Niels van Gogh, stage name of Niels Eiterer (born 1977), German DJ and music producer
Rick van Gog (born 1957), Canadian-born Dutch ice hockey player
Theo van Gogh (art dealer) (1857–1891), Dutch art dealer and brother of Vincent
Theo van Gogh (film director) (1957–2004), assassinated Dutch film director and great-grandson of the art dealer
Vincent van Gogh (1853–1890), Dutch Post-Impressionist painter
 (1890–1978), Dutch engineer, son of Theo, and founder of the Van Gogh Museum
Wil van Gogh (1862–1941), Dutch feminist, youngest sister of Vincent and Theo

See also
Van Gogh's family in his art

References

Dutch-language surnames
Toponymic surnames